Merrifieldia cana is a moth of the family Pterophoridae that is found in Morocco.

The forewings, hindwings and all fringes are grey.

Adults have been recorded in May.

References

Moths described in 1990
cana
Endemic fauna of Morocco
Moths of Africa